The 2019 Pendle Borough Council election took place on 2 May 2019.

Background
Before the election, the Conservative Party had a majority on the council, with 25 seats. The Labour Party had 15 seats and the Liberal Democrats had 9 seats.

17 seats were contested at the election. The 2019 election in Pendle was also part of a Voter ID pilot.

Results summary

Ward results

Barrowford

Blacko and Higherford

Boulsworth

Bradley

Brierfield

Clover Hill

Coates

Craven

Earby

Foulridge

Higham and Pendleside

Horsfield

Old Laund Booth

Reedley

Southfield

Vivary Bridge

Waterside

References

Pendle Borough Council elections
2010s in Lancashire
2019 English local elections
May 2019 events in the United Kingdom